Grevillea pluricaulis is a species of flowering plant in the family Proteaceae and is endemic the Northern Territory in Australia. It is an erect shrub with elliptic leaves, the edges wavy, and light green to apricot-coloured or creamy brown flowers with a pale orange-apricot to pink style.

Description
The edges of the leaves are wavy, the lower surface with hairs flattened against the surface.

Taxonomy
This grevillea was first formally described in 1986 by Donald McGillivray who gave it the name Grevillea goodii subsp. pluricaulis in his New Names in Grevillea (Proteaceae), from specimens collected in 1973 near the Finniss River Crossing by Clyde Dunlop. In 1994, Peter Olde and Neil Marriott raised the subspecies to species status as Grevillea pluricaulis. The specific epithet (pluricaulis) means "several stems".

Distribution and habitat
Grevillea pluricaulis occurs in the tropical Top End of the Northern Territory, from Delissaville to the Finniss River, Port Keats and the Newcastle Range, as well as on Melville Island. It grows in open mixed eucalypt forest or shrubland on sandy or lateritic soils.

References

pluricaulis
Proteales of Australia
Endemic flora of Australia
Flora of the Northern Territory
Taxa named by Donald McGillivray
Plants described in 1986